The Battle of Fort Stephenson in August 1813 was an American victory during the War of 1812. American forces successfully defended the fort in August 1813; it guarded an important supply depot. It was located on the west bank of the Sandusky River more than 10 miles upstream from Sandusky Bay in what is now Ohio. The town of Fremont, Ohio developed around the site.

Background
After failing to defeat American forces in the siege of Fort Meigs, the British under Henry Procter withdrew. Procter attempted to take Fort Meigs again in July by staging a mock battle to lure the defenders out of the fort. The ploy failed, and Procter abandoned the idea of taking the fort.

The British and Indian force moved east to try to capture an American supply base on the Sandusky River, which was guarded by Fort Stephenson several miles from Sandusky Bay, also in northern Ohio. They sailed upriver with some of their ships.

The fort was commanded by Major George Croghan with a garrison of 160 U.S. Regulars (17th U.S. Infantry-later consolidated into US 3rd Infantry Regiment) under his command. William Henry Harrison, the U.S. commander of the Northwest Frontier, believed Procter's force to be larger than it was and ordered Croghan to destroy the fort and withdraw. Croghan insisted that he could hold the fort and stayed. Harrison agreed to let Croghan stay, but still fearing the worst, the commanding officer moved all other available forces 10 miles (16 km) away from Fort Stephenson.

Battle

In August 1813, American Major George Croghan was in charge of 160 soldiers at Fort Stephenson, a base on the Sandusky River in what is now Sandusky County, Ohio which guarded a nearby supply depot. British commander Henry Procter arrived with a superior force that included at least 500 British regulars, 800 American Indians under Major Robert Dickson, and at least 2,000 more under Tecumseh. Procter met Croghan under a flag of truce and urged him to surrender, but Croghan refused. The British then bombarded the fort by artillery and gunboat, to little effect. Croghan returned fire with his single cannon, "Old Betsy" while frequently changing its position in the hopes that the British would believe he had more than one artillery piece. When Croghan's supply of ammunition ran low, he ordered his men to cease fire.

Croghan deduced that the British were going to strike in full force at the northwestern angle of the fort, so he ordered his men to conceal "Old Betsy" in a blockhouse at that location. The next morning, the British feinted twice at the southern angle, then approached the northwest one. American gunners surprised them by uncovering "Old Betsy" and firing at point blank range, which destroyed the British column. Procter withdrew and sailed away. British casualties were reported at 26 killed, 41 wounded, and 29 missing. American casualties were only one killed and seven wounded.

Five currently active units of the US Regular Army (1-3 Inf, 2-3 Inf, 4-3 Inf, 2-7 Inf and 3-7 Inf) carry on the lineages of the old 17th and 24th Infantry Regiments, both of which had elements that were engaged at Fort Stephenson.

Results
The battle was a victory for the Americans. Croghan was celebrated as a national hero and promoted to lieutenant colonel. Both Procter and Harrison were criticized for their parts in the battle. The British and Tecumseh were growing increasingly aware of Procter's shortcomings. Harrison was criticized for not making a whole-hearted effort to come to the fort's aid. Yet the British had been defeated, and Procter withdrew to Canada. In the following months, the Americans won decisive victories at the battles of Lake Erie and the Thames.

Notes

References

External links
http://members.tripod.com/~war1812/batsteve.html
https://web.archive.org/web/20120204064746/http://www.sandusky-county-scrapbook.net/FtStephenson.htm

Fort Stephenson
Fort Stephenson
Fort Stephenson
1813 in Ohio
August 1813 events